Lerøyna or Lerøy is an island in Øygarden Municipality in Vestland county, Norway.  The  island lies at the south end of the Raunefjorden, between the mainland Bergen Peninsula and the large island of Sotra.  The smaller island of Bjelkarøyna lies just northeast of Lerøyna.

The island has about 30 permanent residents and many vacation cabins.  There is no road connection off the island, but there is a regular ferry route from Klokkarvik on Sotra, to Lerøyna, to Bjelkarøyna, and then to Hjellestad in Bergen on the mainland. Øygarden and Bergen municipalities have been making plans to build a road bridge connecting Lerøyna and Bjelkarøyna with a possible connection to the mainland.

See also
List of islands of Norway

References

Islands of Vestland
Øygarden